Ideas usually refer to a person's thoughts or a developed concepts.

Ideas may also refer to:

 I-DEAS, the CAx software
 Ideas: General Introduction to Pure Phenomenology, a book by Edmund Husserl
 Ideas (radio show), a Canadian radio program
 Ideas (retailer), a Pakistani retail chain
 Institute for Democracy and Economic Affairs, or IDEAS, a Malaysian think tank
 International Defence Exhibition and Seminar, a major biennial defence event based in Pakistan
 LSE IDEAS, an international affairs research centre at the London School of Economics
 Theory of forms, or theory of ideas, a theory of abstract entities created by Plato, referred to as Ideas or Forms

See also
 Idea (disambiguation)
 IDEAS (disambiguation)
 Ideas Festival (disambiguation)